Jaque (Spanish for the Chess move check) was a Spanish chess magazine, published twice a month in Valencia. It started in San Sebastian in 1970 and was the Spanish leading chess magazine since then. Some of the best chess players in the world contributed to the magazine. Its last issue was published in July 2012.

See also
 List of magazines in Spain

References

External links
Jaque

1970 in chess
2012 in chess
1970 establishments in Spain
2012 disestablishments in Spain
Chess periodicals
Chess in Spain
Defunct magazines published in Spain
Magazines established in 1970
Magazines disestablished in 2012
Mass media in San Sebastián
Mass media in Valencia
Spanish-language magazines